Merosargus gracilis is a species of soldier fly in the family Stratiomyidae.

Distribution
Venezuela, Ecuador, Peru, Brazil.

References

Stratiomyidae
Insects described in 1888
Diptera of South America
Taxa named by Samuel Wendell Williston